Rejected is an animated film directed by Don Hertzfeldt that was released in 2000. It was nominated for an Academy Award for Best Animated Short Film the following year at the 73rd Academy Awards, and received 27 awards from film festivals around the world.

Story

The film takes place over four segments and is initially introduced as a collection of unaired promo interstitials for the fictional "Family Learning Channel." The "advertisements" are surreal, feature non-human characters, are often gruesome, and have nothing to do with the product. The second section is introduced as a collection of rejected advertisements for the fictional "Johnson & Mills Corporation" and features the same surreal dark and absurd humour as the earlier section. The third section is introduced with an explanation that the animator had begun further rejecting the norms of animation and a single short is then shown which was apparently animated with Hertzfeld's left hand only. In this short, the audio is garbled and the characters speak only complete nonsense.

The fourth and final segment is introduced with a title card explaining that the "rejected" cartoons began falling apart. Various characters and elements from the earlier shorts then appear in disjointed succession as their world literally falls apart: Clouds and stars fall from the sky, killing characters; the paper the cartoons are drawn on crumples and destroys the animations; characters attempt to break out of the screen or are sucked in to holes in the page. A close up on a distorted, screaming character ends the short which abruptly cuts to end credits scored with dramatic classical music.

Production
Hertzfeldt's first film after graduating from college, Rejected was photographed on a 35mm rostrum camera he purchased in 1999.

Rejected features simple hand-drawn artwork, featuring mostly black pen animation on a white background with occasional use of color. As the film progresses and the fictionalized animator begins to fall apart, the drawings become more crude and the animation becomes more erratic. As the film concludes, the paper that the animation is drawn on begins to crumple and tear, and the characters are seen struggling to evade the destruction.

Besides the iconic Allegro ma non troppo from Beethoven's 9th that plays in the text introductions to each segment, a particular segment with the "Fluffy Guys" uses background music from the Swedish Christmas song Nu är det jul igen.

Inspiration

Although the film is fictional and Hertzfeldt has never done any advertising work, he did receive many offers to do television commercials after Billy's Balloon received international attention and acclaim. In appearances he would often tell the humorous story of how he was tempted to produce the worst possible cartoons he could come up with for the companies, run off with their money, and see if they would actually make it to air. Eventually this became the germ for Rejected'''s theme of a collection of cartoons so bad they were rejected by advertising agencies, leading to their creator's breakdown.

Hertzfeldt has never accepted "real" advertising work and has stated numerous times on his website and in public appearances that he never will, as he feels advertisements are "lies" and he does not want to lie to his audience.

Release
Exhibition historyRejected world-premiered at the San Diego Comic Convention in 2000. Between hundreds of film festival appearances, Rejected also toured North American theaters in 2000, 2001, and 2002 with Spike and Mike's Festival of Animation; in 2001 and 2002 again with a retrospective touring program of Hertzfeldt's and animator Bill Plympton's films called "The Don and Bill Show"; and returned to theaters once again in 2003 and 2004 with Hertzfeldt's own the Animation Show tour.

Released nationwide in theaters through the Spike and Mike's Festival of Animation in 2000, the short won 27 film festival awards and was nominated for an Oscar for Best Animated Short Film the following year. 

In the early 2000s, pirated copies of Rejected turned the film into a viral sensation online, where it has been credited with shaping the surreal sense of humor of the early Internet.

In 2003, two of the "Fluffy Guy" characters reappeared in three Hertzfeldt cartoons created to introduce and book-end the first year of the Animation Show: Welcome to the Show, Intermission in the Third Dimension, and the End of the Show.Rejected was scheduled to air on Adult Swim in 2001 but was delayed for unknown reasons—it was rescheduled to air in November 2002 "uncut and commercial free", and was heavily promoted on the network that week. However, the short was pulled from the schedule at the last minute, for unknown reasons. Rumors about the reasons behind this highly unusual action have included: the film's brief use of the phrase "Sweet Jesus" ("Jesus" being a word allegedly not allowed on a Turner Network back then), and an anonymous high-ranking network executive simply not finding the short to be funny. Rejected has since aired without incident on the Cartoon Network in other countries as well as on other international television networks, but has to date never been broadcast on American television. However, a brief clip from the film has since aired on the Adult Swim anthology series Off the Air, 14 years later, in the episode Holes. The scene mentioned in the episode is the scene with the "fluffy guys" in which one announces that his "anus is bleeding."

In 2020, for the film's twentieth anniversary, Hertzfeldt appeared at the Austin Film Society for a rare 35mm screening and discussed the making of the cartoon and its impact.

DVD and Blu-ray
In 2001 Bitter Films released a limited edition DVD "single" of the short film. The DVD "single" featured a deleted scene as well as an audio commentary, and is now out of print.

In 2006, Rejected was remastered and restored for inclusion on the DVD, "Bitter Films Volume 1", a compilation of Don Hertzfeldt's short films from 1995–2005.  Special features on this DVD relating to Rejected included a new text commentary by Hertzfeldt (via closed-caption boxes), footage from the abandoned cartoon "the Spanky the Bear Show" that later evolved into a central scene in the film, original pencil tests, the 2001 audio commentary, and dozens of pages devoted to Hertzfeldt's original sketches, storyboards, notes, and deleted ideas from the film.

In 2015, the cartoon was remastered again, this time in high definition, for inclusion on the Blu-ray of It's Such a Beautiful Day.

A 35-second deleted scene from Rejected was only released on the 2001 DVD "single". In it, a father inquires into his son's desire to drink goat's blood. The scene appears to fit in with the "Johnson & Mills" portion of the original film, and is revealed to be an advertisement for cotton-swabs at the end.

LegacyRejected is now considered a cult classic and one of the most influential animated films ever made.

In 2009, Rejected was the only short film named as one of the "Films of the Decade" by Salon. In 2010, it was noted as one of the five "most innovative animated films of the past ten years" by The Huffington Post. Indiewire film critic Eric Kohn named Rejected one of the "10 best films of the 21st century" on his list for the BBC Culture poll in 2016.

In 2018 New York Magazine wrote, "If there is a single piece of media that inspired what we nebulously refer to as “Internet humor,” it’s probably Rejected.

In popular culture
 A fan of the film, quoting, "I am the Queen of France!" appeared on the Late Show with David Letterman.
 The alternate dimension scenes from the Aqua Teen Hunger Force episode "Broodwich" were an acknowledged homage to Don Hertzfeldt. Hertzfeldt's films, and Rejected in particular, were a strong early influence on Adult Swim writers and Aqua Teen creators Matt Maiellaro and Dave Willis.
 A 2013 episode of the Fine Brothers' web series YouTubers React featured Rejected.
The introduction section of the 2006 video game Prey features a crude scrawling in the room's bathroom that is a direct reference to the first sketch; "My spoon is too big."
 In the first episode of the 26th season of The Simpsons, Clown in the Dumps, the opening couch gag was created by Don Hertzfeldt.  Rejected established the roots of a dystopia by consumerism style of satire through the guise of rejected advertisements; this short cuts directly to the point.  It depicts Homer using a time-traveling remote control to regress to his original 1987 character model, then accidentally going into a distant future incarnation of the show called The Sampsans where he and his family have evolved into grotesque, mindless, catchphrase-spouting mutants.  Carey Bodenheimer of CNN wrote: "[The Simpsons''] kicked off season 26 with a staggering, Don Hertzfeldt directed intro sequence."

See also
 Criticism of capitalism
 Surreal humour
 Independent animation
 Postmodernist animation
 Arthouse animation

References

External links
 
 
 

2000 animated films
2000 films
American animated short films
Short films directed by Don Hertzfeldt
2000s English-language films
2000s American films